Mel Tormé's California Suite is a 1957 studio album by Mel Tormé, of his California suite.

Tormé first wrote the suite as a twenty-minute piece in 1949, arranged by Neal Hefti and Billy May, with Peggy Lee providing vocals. It was expanded to this LP length version in 1957. The suite was later recorded by Sammy Davis, Jr.

Track listing 
All music and lyrics written by Mel Tormé, except "San Fernando Valley" by Tormé and Gordon Jenkins.

 "The Territory (The Soil Was Good)" – 2:57
 "We Think the West Coast Is the Best" – 1:42
 "La Jolla" – 3:04
 "Coney Island" – 2:45
 "Atlantic City Boardwalk" – 2:33
 "They Go to San Diego" – 3:53
 "San Fernando Valley" – 5:04
 "Got the Date on the Golden Gate" – 4:21
 "L.A." – 1:48
 "Six O'Clock (It's Time to Leave the Set)" – 0:55
 "Nothing to Do (But Shed a Tear)" – 0:22
 "Poor Little Extra Girl" – 3:52
 "West Coast Is the Best Coast (Reprise)" – 3:06

Personnel

Performance 
 Mel Tormé - vocals
 Marty Paich - arranger, conductor
 Pete Candoli - trumpet
 Don Fagerquist - trumpet
 Bob Enevoldson - trombone
 Dave Pell - tenor sax
 Barney Kessel - guitar
 Max Bennett - bass
 Mel Lewis - drums
 Alvin Stoller - drums

References 

1957 albums
Suites (music)
Mel Tormé albums
Albums arranged by Marty Paich
Bethlehem Records albums
Albums conducted by Marty Paich